"Blood & Glitter" is a song by German gothic metal band Lord of the Lost. It was released on 24 December 2022, through Napalm. The song is currently scheduled to represent Germany in the Eurovision Song Contest 2023 in Liverpool, United Kingdom after winning Unser Lied für Liverpool, Germany's national final.

Background

The dark Rock song was released as the lead single from their eleventh studio album Blood & Glitter (2022). Lead singer Chris Harms revealed that the band had actually applied to represent Germany for many years leading up to their win in 2023. Starting on 24 February 2023, fans were able to vote for their favourite entry online. The performance was described as a "fiery Glam rock show", somewhere between "dark" and "Gothic metal". The band eventually won the contest, having earned 189 points consisting of 146 from fans and viewers and 43 points the international juries.

Eurovision Song Contest

At Eurovision
For their performance in Liverpool, Harms plans a glamorous rock show for the band, wanting to include red pyrotechnic rain to reflect the message of the song.

References

2022 singles
2022 songs
Eurovision songs of 2023
Eurovision songs of Germany